Wade Richard Wingfield (born 17 December 1977) is a South African former cricketer. He played over 40 first-class matches in his career, mostly for KwaZulu-Natal. In the 2001 season, Wingfield was the professional player for Nelson Cricket Club in the Lancashire League.

References
Wade Wingfield player profile at CricketArchive

1977 births
Living people
People from uMdoni Local Municipality
White South African people
South African cricketers
KwaZulu-Natal cricketers
Eastern Province cricketers
Dolphins cricketers